Collin William Taylor (born February 28, 1987) is an sim football wide receiver who is currently a member of the WFAs Green Bay Wolfpack.

Taylor attended Carmel High School, in Carmel, Indiana. He played two years as a wide receiver. As a senior in 2004, he led the Greyhounds with 45 catches for 900 yards and 12 touchdowns, helping them to an  8-4 season. After his senior season, he moved on to Indiana University where he redshirted in 2005, played wide receiver from 2006 through 2008 and finished his career as a free safety in 2009.

Early life
Born the son of John and Catherine Taylor, Collin attended Carmel High School, in Carmel, Indiana. He played two years as a wide receiver. As a senior in 2004, he led the Greyhounds with 45 catches for 900 yards and 12 touchdowns, helping them to an 8–4 season.

College career
Taylor walked-on to the Indiana Hoosiers football team in fall of 2005 and redshirted that same season.
During the 2006 season, Taylor did not appear in a single game for the Hoosiers. In 2007, Taylor made his college debut against Indiana State. Taylor played in three games during the season, appearing only on special teams. During the 2008 season, Taylor appeared in all 12 games for the Hoosiers games, making his first career receptions against Iowa on October 11. 11 weeks into the season, the Hoosiers were faced with a rash of injuries, so Taylor moved from wide receiver to free safety for the Hoosiers.

Statistics
Sources:

Professional career

Pre-draft
Prior to the 2010 NFL Draft, Taylor was projected to be undrafted by NFLDraftScout.com. He was rated as the 62nd-best free safety in the draft. He was not invited to the NFL Scouting Combine, he posted the following numbers during his pro-day workouts at Indiana University:

Oklahoma City Yard Dawgz
After going undrafted in 2010, Taylor was assigned to the Oklahoma City Yard Dawgz of the Arena Football League. The only game in which Taylor played for the Yard Dawgz came on May 28, when he had an interceptions for touchdown against the Alabama Vipers. He was released before the season's end.

Tulsa Talons
Shortly after his release, Taylor joined the Tulsa Talons. The Talons were short on players due to injury, so they offered Taylor a chance to return to his natural position of wide receiver, and he scored a touchdown on just his second career professional reception.

Reading Express
Taylor joined the Reading Express of the Indoor Football League in 2011. He was 3rd on the team with 651 yards receiving and had 15 touchdowns, as the Express went 8–6 and lost in the IFL United Conference Semi-Finals.

Iowa Barnstormers
Taylor joined the Iowa Barnstormers in 2012. Taylor re-signed with the Barnstormers for the 2013 season.

Cleveland Gladiators

Taylor was assigned to the Cleveland Gladiators on October 1, 2013. He won the Al Lucas Hero Jason Foundation Award in 2016.

Beijing Lions
Taylor was selected by the Beijing Lions of the China Arena Football League (CAFL) in the fifth round of the 2016 CAFL Draft. He earned All-Pro North Division All-Star honors after catching 45 passes for 586 yards and 12 touchdowns.

Guangzhou Power
Taylor was listed on the Guangzhou Power's roster for the 2018 season.

Albany Empire
On April 9, 2018, he was assigned to the Albany Empire. On March 14, 2019, Taylor returned to the Empire when he was again assigned to the team.

Green Bay Wolfpack 
On June 30, 2019, he was virtually drafted by the Green Bay Wolfpack 38th overall in the Season 2 NGFL (At the time) Draft. He has been apart of the team ever since being drafted he has progressed from a bronze player to a gold player.

Career AFL receiving statistics

Career AFL defensive statistics

Career WFA Stats

WFA Career 
Taylor was drafted by the Green Bay Wolfpack 38th overall in the Season 2 NGFL Draft. Taylor's rookie season would see him jump from the ASFL (WFAs defunct Minor League) to the NGFL and back multiple times in Season 2. Taylor would see success in his stints in the NGFL in Season 2 helping the Wolfpack to there first playoff appearance in franchise history. Taylor would play in both playoff games.

Taylor would be brought back for all 16 games in Season 3 where he would get close to 1,000 yards. He would be selected to the only All-Star game in the leagues history. The Wolfpack would get a 7-9 record, enough for a playoff spot and would make a run to the Atlantic Conference Championship. They would fall to the Chicago Ghosts 28-20.

Taylor would once again start all 16 games for the Wolfpack. Taylor would notch his first 1,000 yard season helping the Wolfpack to an 8-8 record and another playoff berth. The Pack would make it back to the Conference Finals for the 3rd straight season but would blow a 14 point lead losing to Chicago.

Taylor would start all 12 games for Green Bay. Taylor would get his 2nd straight season with 1,000 yards helping lead the Wolfpack to a 9-3 record and the 1 seed in the Pacific. The Pack would make it to there 4th straight conference finals game. Taylor would catch the game sealing TD over Colorado to send the Wolfpack to there first Genbowl 37-28. Taylor would later drop an open TD in Genbowl V as the Pack fell to the VooDoo 35-30

Taylor would  once more start all 12 games having his most productive season in Season 6 notching his 3rd straight 1,000 yard season. The Wolfpack would go 8-4 losing in the divisional round of the playoffs to Genbowl runner ups, San Diego

Taylor would start all 4 games of the shortened WFA season only having 364 yards. The Pack would go 4-0 in the season but would once more in the divisional to the Genbowl Champs, Victoria.

Taylor would start all 12 games of Season 8 having 990 yards a league and career high, 15 touchdowns. Taylor would do this despite Green Bays revolving door of QBs, this being GBs first season without QB Nate Petterman Jr, who the Pack let walk. The Pack would go 6-6 and lose in the divisional too the Vegas Venom

Taylor would start all 7 games for the Pack in the shortened 7 game season having 732 yards and 8 touchdowns. Taylor was on track for over 1200 yards and 13 touchdowns before the league cut the season short. The Pack went 4-3 and made it too the Elite 8 before falling to Miami    

On February 27th 2023, Taylor would be inducted to the WFA Hall Of Fame

References

External links
https://www.worldfootballalliance.com/
 ArenaFan profile

1987 births
Living people
Carmel High School (Indiana) alumni
People from Carmel, Indiana
Players of American football from Indiana
American football wide receivers
American football defensive backs
Indiana Hoosiers football players
Oklahoma City Yard Dawgz players
Tulsa Talons players
Reading Express players
Iowa Barnstormers players
Cleveland Gladiators players
Beijing Lions players
Guangzhou Power players
Albany Empire (AFL) players